Adult Digital Distraction (ADd) is a block airing on G4 Canada. Similar to Adult Swim and Teletoon at Night, Adult Digital Distraction airs mature comedies. It parallels the American counterpart's Midnight Spank block. Its programming consist of Adult Swim shows (some previously aired on Teletoon at Night), syndicated sitcoms and G4 original series. In late 2011, the block had been discontinued due to pressure from the CRTC. However, in early 2012, the Adult Digital Distraction block had been relaunched.

Former programs 
 Aqua Teen Hunger Force (now airing on Adult Swim)
 Check It Out! with Dr. Steve Brule (now airing on Adult Swim)
 Childrens Hospital (now airing on Adult Swim)
 Delocated (now airing on Adult Swim)
 The Drinky Crow Show (now airing on Adult Swim)
 Eagleheart (now airing on Adult Swim)
 Fat Guy Stuck in Internet (now airing on Adult Swim)
 Freaks and Geeks
 Happy Tree Friends
 Harvey Birdman, Attorney at Law (now airing on Adult Swim)
 The IT Crowd
 Mary Shelley's Frankenhole (now airing on Adult Swim)
 Metalocalypse (now airing on Adult Swim)
 NTSF:SD:SUV:: (now airing on Adult Swim)
 The Office
 Squidbillies (now airing on Adult Swim)
 Superjail! (now airing on Adult Swim)
 Tim and Eric Awesome Show, Great Job! (now airing on Adult Swim)
 Titan Maximum (now airing on Adult Swim)
 Tom Goes to the Mayor (now airing on Adult Swim)
 Undeclared
 The Venture Bros. (now airing on Adult Swim)
 Web Soup (Moved to daytime slot)
 Xavier: Renegade Angel (now airing on Adult Swim)

See also
 G4 Canada

References

External links
 G4 Canada 

G4 Media
TechTV
Rogers Communications